Bislan Elimkhanov (ru)
 Yusup Elmurzaev (ru)
 Yuri Em (ru)
 Yevgeny Epov

References 
 

Heroes E